Renovation (also called remodeling) is the process of improving broken, damaged, or outdated structures. Renovations are typically done on either commercial or residential buildings. Additionally, renovation can refer to making something new, or bringing something back to life and can apply in social contexts. For example, a community can be renovated if it is strengthened and revived. It can also be restoring something to a former better state (as by cleaning, repairing, or rebuilding).

Phases and process of renovations

The building renovation process can usually, depending on the extents of the renovation, be broken down into several phases. The phases are as follow. 
Project initiation - The beginning of the project that includes the hiring of construction and design teams, defining the scope of the work, creating a budget, and communicating the needs, expectations, and wants from both the client and building team
Existing conditions analysis - This includes measuring, drawing, and analyzing the structure to be renovated, and identifying any major issues with the project that could effect work to be done
Initial design - Beginning the design work by testing out concept ideas, designing multiple iterations of outcomes, communicating with the client, and receiving client feedback on the design to make changes
Finalizing design - Finalizing the design work by making sure the design is what the client wants, making sure the design works with existing conditions, creating a more detailed design (including specs and engineering), also could include the beginning of construction or demolition work while the design is being finalized
Construction and demolition - Starting the physical work by completing demolition needed, structural repairs needed, building new designed conditions, applying finishes, and trouble shooting any problems or unknown conditions that are brought to light during construction
Project finalization - The end of the project which includes turnover to the client, punch listing, walking through with the client, and verifying that project scope and expectations were met
Projects involving renovation require not just flexibility, but a plan that had been agreed upon by multiple parties. The planning process will involve feedback from financial investors of the project, and from the designer. Part of planning will also entail the collection of data for the completion of the project and then the project plan will be revised and given consent before continuing with renovations.  

Technology has had a meaningful effect on the renovation process, increasing the significance and strength of the planning stage. The availability of free online design tools has improved visualization of the changes, at a fraction of the cost of hiring a professional designer. The decision regarding changes is also influenced by the purpose of basement renovation . Depending on the significance of these changes a professional may be required, especially if any changes other then cosmetic work (paint or finishes) is required. Many local codes require a professional to complete work in the built environment such as structural changes, new walls, new plumbing, or many others. Doing these changes without hiring a professional can result in health effects, safety concerns, damages, fines, and increased cost due to having to hire a professional after self-work. Most builders focus on building new homes, so renovating is typically a part-time activity for such tradespeople. The processes and services required for renovations are quite specific and, once plans are signed off, building a new home is relatively predictable. However, during renovation projects, flexibility is often required from renovation companies to respond to unexpected issues that arise. Renovations usually require all of the sub-trades that are needed for the construction of a new building.

In case of a so-called "fix-and-flip" (repair and resell) objective, an ROI (return on investment) can result from changes to fix a structural issue, to fix design flow yield, or to use light and color to make rooms appear more spacious. Because interior renovation could change of the internal structure of the house, ceiling construction, circuit configuration and partition walls, etc., such work related to the structure of the house, of course, also includes renovation of wallpaper posting, furniture settings, lighting, etc often times an interior designer is required as well.

Reasons to renovate

Many people renovate homes to create a new appearance. Builders may renovate homes to enhance the home's value as a stable source of income. Homeowners often renovate their homes to increase the re-sale value and to turn a profit when selling. Homeowners may also want to add renovations that make their home more energy efficient, green or sustainable. Also, over time, a homeowners personal preferences and needs may change, and the home will be renovated for improved aesthetics, comfort, or functionality.

Other types of renovations also can be initiated for similar reasons. The user or owner of a building can change which can effect the needs or wants for the space prompting a renovation. This is becoming more popular as buildings owners are renting or leasing floors or sections of the buildings to companies which have different spacial requirements than the previous users causing needed renovation. Renovations can also occur as companies increase size which could lead to needed additional retail, office, or other types of spaces. Similarly to homes other building owners could also want renovations to increased value, make the building more energy efficient, green or sustainable, or to update the building.

Wood in renovations
Wood is versatile and flexible, making it the easiest construction material for renovations, and wood buildings can be redesigned to suit changing needs. Few homeowners or professional remodelers possess the skill and equipment that is required to alter steel-frame or concrete structures.

When looking at embodied carbon in building materials wood is often labeled as the most sustainable. This is because it sequesters carbon which if certified sustainably sourced will significantly reduce embodied carbon of buildings. This makes it a low emitting choice for a building material for an overall building and for renovations.

Forest certification verifies that wood products have been sourced from well-managed forests. Most certification programs provide online search options so that consumers can find certified products—the Certification Canada program includes a search option for all of the certification programs that are in use in Canada.

In North America, most structures are demolished because of external forces such as zoning changes and rising land values. Additionally, buildings that cannot be modified to serve the functional needs of the occupants are subject to demolition. Very few buildings on the continent are demolished due to structural degradation.

The Athena Institute surveyed 227 commercial and residential buildings that were demolished in St. Paul, Minnesota, between 2000 and mid-2003. Thirty percent of the buildings were less than 50 years old, and 6% were less than 25 years old. The four top reasons for demolition were “area redevelopment” (35%), “building’s physical condition” (31%), “not suitable for anticipated use” (22%), and “fire damage” (7%). Lack of maintenance was cited as the specific problem for 54 of the 70 buildings where physical condition was given as the reason for demolition.

Sustainability of renovations 
Currently, worldwide 38% of emissions and 35% of energy use come from the building sector, including building construction and operation. This means renovations contribute to emissions and energy use of the building sector. These percentages are the largest portion of the total emissions and energy use globally. This makes buildings have the highest potential for decreasing these percentages as well as the largest need to decrease them. Renovations are also one way to do this. 

Renovations decrease emissions as instead of demolishing a building just to build a new one the building is reused. Reuse of buildings is not always desirable as it is often pursued to have a building designed for the many individual and unique needs building owners have but it is not always a necessity. Renovations can take a building and make it completely different from the old building just reusing the structure, which is often the largest contributor of embodied carbon to a building. However, in order to be able to do this buildings need to be design durably and re-use. Designing for durability and reuse is designing for new buildings to be "long lasting, use-adaptable, and culturally valuable" to allow for the building to be kept for longer to minimize emissions from a complete rebuild. 

Having these ideas in mind while designing new buildings significantly increases the likelihood for renovations to happen. Buildings are more likely to be torn down because they can't accommodate the new desired use then because the structure is failing. Renovations allow old buildings to fit new needs in a way that outputs less emissions than a complete tear down and construction of a new building which is often a feasible option.

Effects

Renovation has several effects on economies, including:
creating jobs
increasing spending
increasing property values
generating tax revenue during both the construction and residential phases

See also
 Indoor air quality
 Home improvement
 Lead positioning
 Power tools
 Repair Café
 How Buildings Learn (book)

References

Further reading
 Best Practices for Indoor Air Quality when Remodeling Your Home
 Renovation and Repair, Part of Indoor Air Quality Design Tools for Schools
 Addressing Indoor Environmental Concerns During Remodeling

Interior design
Home improvement